Forget About It is a 2006 American comedy film directed by BJ Davis starring Burt Reynolds, Robert Loggia, Charles Durning, Raquel Welch, Richard Grieco and Kimberley Kates.

Plot 
A trio of retired military servicemen who find a suitcase of money near their Arizona trailer park. Little do they know it belongs to a mobster in the witness protection program. The old men's neighbor is played by Raquel Welch.

Cast

Main 
 Burt Reynolds as Sam LeFleur
 Robert Loggia as Carl Campobasso
 Charles Durning as Eddie O'Brien
 Raquel Welch as Christine DeLee
 Richard Grieco as Anthony Amato
 Kimberley Kates as Michelle Winchester
 Phil Amato as Vito
 Tim Thomerson as Arizona Al
 Phyllis Diller as Mrs. Hertzberg
 Michael Paloma as Peter Nitti / Don Antonio Giovanni
 David Zappone as Manuel Rios
 Wayne Crawford as Marshal Cimino
 Natalie Roth as Becky Rami
 Joanna Pacula as Talia Nitti
 Elena Sahagun as Connie Wang
 Byron Browne as Bodyguard

Supporting 
 Barbara Barron as Biker Babe
 Towie Bixby as Newspaper Girl
 Will Bribiescas as Cop
 Christopher Eliot Bridges as Courthouse Husband
 Tori Bridges as FBI Agent
 James Brown as Strip Club Patron
 Anthony Casanova as Gangster
 Bryan Terrell Clark as Bodyguard (Credited as Bryan Clark)
 Dusty Dukatz as Mrs. Hertzberg's boy toy
 Timothy Gossman as US Marshal Agent
 Steve Gresser as Strip Club Patron
 Todd C. Guzze as Mobster
 Michael LeDesma as Eddie's Grandson
 Roderick LeDesma as Restaurant patron
 Lynn Melton as stripper in strip club 
 Jennifer McLeod as Dinner Date
 Elena Muia as Bank girl
 Bruce Nelson as FBI Agent
 Anthony Perrego as Mobster
 Kevin Quick as Cab Driver
 Marc Alan Waugh as Police Officer
 Garriden Wolff as Man in Audience

Cameo/Uncredited 
 Bob Huff as Airport Traveler
 Elaine Huff as Airport Traveler
 Mark Jacobson as Dinner Guest
 Alonso Parra as Casino Gambler
 Jennifer E. Rio as Waitress
 Scott Lee Scarborough as Club DJ
 Tatyana Ryan
 Gloria Ware

Awards and nominations 
Forget About It was screened at the New Jersey Film Festival in May 2006, where it won Best Film. It premiered in Waterbury, Connecticut and Phoenix, Arizona on October 27, 2006.

Controversy 
In 2008, Gregory Conley posted that he received legal warnings from BJ Davis and Julia Davis regarding a negative review of Forget About It. On January 13, Gregory posted that he'd received a Digital Millennium Copyright Act complaint from Julia Davis, and on January 14 posted an explanation attributed to Stephen Eckelberry of Big Screen Entertainment. There were some outraged posts made to websites such as Wired News and Techdirt.

Release 

Forget About It is owned by Big Screen Entertainment Group and was released January 8, 2008 in the United States by Allumination Filmworks.

References

External links

 Forget About It Official Website

2006 films
2006 comedy films
Films set in Arizona
Films shot in New Jersey
Films shot in Arizona